Unwritten Law is the third album by the San Diego-based punk rock band Unwritten Law, released in 1998 by Interscope Records. It was their first album to chart, reaching No. 16 on Billboard's Top Heatseekers chart. Music videos were filmed for the songs "Teenage Suicide", "California Sky", "Holiday", "Cailin", and "Lonesome". "Cailin" and "Lonesome" were released as singles, the former being Unwritten Law's first song to chart, reaching No. 28 on the Modern Rock Tracks chart.

Micah Albao performed as a session bassist on the album, the band's original bassist John Bell having departed the group the previous year. Following the recording sessions, Pat "PK" Kim of Sprung Monkey joined Unwritten Law as their new permanent bass player. The album includes guest appearances by Brandon Boyd and Mike Einziger of Incubus on the hidden track "418".

Track listing

Personnel

Band
Scott Russo – lead vocals
Steve Morris – lead guitar, backing vocals
Rob Brewer – rhythm guitar, backing vocals
Wade Youman – drums, percussion

Additional musicians
Micah Albao – bass guitar
Rick Parashar – piano, keyboards, tambura, percussion
Geoff Turner – DJ
Erik Aho – additional guitar on "Cailin"
Brandon Boyd – spoken vocals and didgeridoo on "418"
Mike Einziger – additional guitar on "418"
Craig Yarnold – additional backing vocals on "Holiday"

Production
Rick Parashar – producer, engineer, mixing
Andy Wallace – mixing of "Sorry"
Jon Plum – assistant producer, engineer, and mixing
Geoff Ott – second engineer
Kelly Gray – additional mixing on "Underground" and "418"
Jon Mathias – engineer of "Holiday"
George Marino – mastering

Artwork
Lorna Turner – graphic design
Craig Tomkinson and Dave Morris – photography

Charts

References

Unwritten Law albums
1998 albums
Albums produced by Rick Parashar